The Dassault MD.452 Mystère is a 1950s French fighter-bomber.

Development
After the success of the Ouragan, Dassault was working on a more advanced machine which would take to the air in early 1951 as the MD.452 Mystère I.

The first prototype Mystère I was essentially an Ouragan with a 30-degree swept wing and modified tail surfaces. Two further prototypes followed, powered by the Rolls-Royce Tay 250 centrifugal-flow turbojet, an improved version of the Rolls-Royce Nene, built under licence by Hispano-Suiza, and rated at  thrust.

These three Mystère I prototypes led to two Mystère IIA prototypes, powered by the Tay and armed with four  Hispano cannon; and then four Mystère IIB prototypes, which traded the four  cannon for two  DEFA revolver-type cannon. A Mystère IIA was the first French aircraft to break Mach 1 in controlled flight (in a dive), on 28 October 1951.

Operational history
The French Air Force ordered 150 Mystère IICs, with the first production machine flying in June 1954, being delivered in October of that year. The production aircraft featured the twin  DEFA cannon, an Atar 101D turbojet with  thrust, increased tail sweep, and revised intake trunking and internal fuel tank arrangement. Details of external stores are unclear, but a reasonable assumption would be that they were similar to those of the Ouragan.

The last Mystère IIC was delivered in 1957, by which time the type was already being relegated to advanced training duties. Aircraft design was moving very quickly in the 1950s and even as the Mystère IIC was becoming operational, the better Dassault Mystère IVA was flying. The Mystère IIC was very much an interim type, though it did persist in the training role until 1963.

There were no foreign buyers for the Mystère II. As noted, the Israelis wanted to buy 24 but changed their minds and bought Mystère IVAs instead. It appears that the Mystère II was never used in combat.

Variants

MD 452 Mystère I The first of three prototypes was essentially an Ouragan with a 30-degree swept wing and modified tail surfaces. Two further prototypes followed, powered by the  Rolls-Royce Tay 250 centrifugal-flow turbojet.
MD 452 Mystère IIATwo prototypes powered by the Tay and armed with four Hispano 20 mm cannon.
MD 452 Mystère IIBFour IIB prototypes traded the four  cannon for two  DEFA cannon
MD 452 Mystère IIC The standard production aircraft for the French Air Force, with 150 delivered from June 1954. Eleven preproduction IICs were used for operational evaluation and trials with SNECMA Atar 101C axial-flow turbojet and the afterburning Atar 101F.
MD 453 Mystère IIIN A single Mystère prototype built with lateral intakes and a two-seat cockpit, to continue development of the MD 451 Aladin initiated with the MD 450-30-L modified Ouragan. First flown on 18 July 1952 the sole IIIN was never fitted with a radar and was used for ejection seat trials once development of the MD 451 was abandoned. The second and third prototypes were cancelled before completion.

Operators

 French Air Force

Specifications (Mystère IIC)

See also

References

Bibliography

Carbonel, Jean-Christophe. French Secret Projects 1: Post War Fighters. Manchester, UK: Crecy Publishing, 2016 
 
 
 

1950s French fighter aircraft
Mystere
Low-wing aircraft
Single-engined jet aircraft
Cruciform tail aircraft
Aircraft first flown in 1951